Paragenesis is a petrologic concept meaning an equilibrium sequence of mineral phases. It is used in studies of igneous and metamorphic rock genesis and importantly in studies of the hydrothermal deposition of ore minerals and the rock alteration (vein metasomatism) associated with ore mineral deposits. The concept and application of paragenesis, from the Greek for born beside, was first applied by August Breithaupt in 1849 in his work Die Paragenesis der Mineralien.

The paragenetic sequence in mineral formation is an important concept in deciphering the detailed geologic history of ore deposits and metamorphic events. The sequence is worked out through detailed microscopic studies in polished ore mineral section, petrologic thin section and fluid inclusion studies as well as macroscopic field relations.

References

External links 

 Guilbert, John M. and Charles F. Park (1986) The Geology of Ore Deposits, pp. 210–217, Freeman, .
  .

Petrology